Keep It Pimp & Gangsta is the third album released by rap group, Dirty. It was released on February 25, 2003 through Universal Records and was produced by member, Big Pimp, The Highly Respected Dr. Fangaz, Khao, Cool & Dre and Mannie Fresh. Keep It Pimp & Gangsta is thus far, Dirty's most successful album chart-wise, peaking at #63 on the Billboard 200 and #13 on the Top R&B/Hip-Hop Albums and was the duo's last album distributed by Universal, as they would later join the famed Southern hip hop label Rap-a-Lot Records.

Track listing
"Feel Me Ni"- 4:39 ( Produced by The Highly Respected Dr. Fangaz )
"C'mon"- 4:45 (Featuring Pastor Troy)( Produced by Khao )
"Keep It"- 4:15 ( Produced by Khao )
"That's Dirty"- 4:13 (Featuring Mannie Fresh)
"Think About U"- 4:20
"Lose Control (Candy Man, Pt. 2)"- 5:10 ( Produced by Khao )
"Hoochie Mama"- 4:06 ( Produced by The Highly Respected Dr. Fangaz )
"Sholl Iz"- 4:05 ( Produced by Cool & Dre )
"Ackamonkey"- 4:54 ( Produced by The Highly Respected Dr. Fangaz )
"Woodgrain"- 5:15  ( Produced by The Highly Respected Dr. Fangaz )
"Fuck Witcha"- 4:34  ( Produced by Big Pimp )
"My Cadillac"- 3:31 ( Produced by Cool & Dre )
"Chicken Hustlin'"- 4:46 ( Produced by Big Pimp )
"Gangsta"- 4:16 ( Produced by Big Pimp )
"Ghetto Opera"- 4:15 ( Produced by Big Pimp)
"Where da Luv"- 4:28 ( Produced by Big Pimp )
"Ghetto Ride"- 5:12  ( Produced by Big Pimp )

References 

2003 albums
Dirty (group) albums